Mouche Phillips (born 1973) is an Australian actress and theatre producer, best known for her television roles as Aviva "Viv" Newton in Home and Away (1989–90) and Eva Sykes in police procedural series Water Rats (2000–01).

Early life 
Phillips was born in Sydney, and attended Woollahra Public School with several other future actors, including Home and away co-star Justine Clarke and singer Deni Hines, and then St Catherine's School, Waverley from 1984 to 1989. Her father, Tony Lunes was a yacht skipper working in Cornwall, United Kingdom.

Career 
Phillips began her career in 1985 by playing the character of Jackie Wilson in the children's television show Butterfly Island. She then starred as "Beatie Bow" in the 1986 feature film Playing Beatie Bow when she was twelve years old. She later appeared in many Seven Network serials, including A Country Practice and Rafferty's Rules.

On 5 July 1989, she premiered as a cast member of the popular series Home and Away, on which she played Aviva "Viv" Newton. She left the series on 25 May 1990. Phillips was sharing a house with Justine Clarke and began auditioning the week after Clarke had left the serial. Phillips told a writer from Look-in that she liked to be kept busy on set. She explained that "people" were often left trying to find her because she was not where she should have been. Phillips told Graeme Kay from BIG! that the role had taken up too much of her time and she preferred having a free schedule.

She later starred in a number of the Kennedy Miller Productions in the 1980s. She was cast in the ABC series G.P. before, at the age of 17, moving to London, England. Aged 19, she was accepted into the Central School of Speech and Drama.

After returning to Sydney in the mid-1990s, Phillips began producing pub theatre with a group of friends, Jeremy Cumpston, Simon Lyndon and Joel Edgerton, later to be known as the Tamarama Rock Surfers theatre group.

She later starred in PorkChop Productions' first show, a production of Rosencrantz and Guildenstern Are Dead. That led to her being appointed PorkChop's full-time producer, which led her to develop material to stage at the Sydney Opera House. Phillips produced Last Cab to Darwin for PorkChop Productions which was staged at the Opera House in Sydney and at the Black Swan State Theatre Company in Perth.

In 2000, Phillips appeared as a guest in the police series Water Rats where she played Eva Minton-Sykes, wife of Gavin Sykes until 2001. In 2009 she appeared in the third season of the series H2O: Just Add Water where she played Mrs. Taylor, a science teacher, until 2010. She joined the cast of Secrets & Lies where she played Vanessa Turner, the wife of the doctor Timothy Turner on 3 March 2014.

Personal life 
Phillips married Sy Milman on 21 September 2002; the couple had three children and they divorced in 2010. She is currently the owner and creative director of Ripe Productions and took the position of creative producer for Byron Theatre in 2010. She also works as the Sponsorship Manager for the Byron Bay Writers Festival and as the curator of the Byron Bay Soul Street New Year's Eve Event. She also works as the Sponsorship Manager for the Byron Bay Writers Festival She directs a theater program for the Byron Theatre, also has taught several children focused on functions of camera, improvisation and has assisted as a children's casting director and acting teacher.

Memberships and associations 

 Ripe Productions – Owner (June 2001 – Present)
 Byron Theatre – Creative Producer (2010–present)
 Byron Bay Writers Festival – Partnership Manager 
 Byron Bay Soul Street New Year's Eve Event – Curator

Filmography

Film

Television

Producer

Theatre

Awards and nominations

References

External links 
 

1973 births
Living people
Australian film actresses
Australian stage actresses
Australian child actresses
Australian voice actresses
Dramaturges
Australian dramatists and playwrights
Talent agents
Australian theatre managers and producers
Australian radio actresses
Australian soap opera actresses
Actresses from Sydney
Australian women in business
Alumni of the Royal Central School of Speech and Drama
20th-century Australian actresses
21st-century Australian actresses